Brejinho de Nazaré is a municipality located in the Brazilian state of Tocantins. Its population was 5,519 (2020) and its area is 1,724 km².

References

Municipalities in Tocantins